Army Men: Major Malfunction is a third-person shooter video game developed by Team17 and published by Global Star Software for Xbox and PlayStation 2.

Story
The main character is a soldier named Private Anderson. He is forced to fight his way through many enemy soldiers as he tries to defeat the main villain, Major Malfunction, who has taken over the house with his toy army.

Reception 

The game was widely panned by critics for its poor story, graphics, enemy artificial intelligence, and according to GameSpot its "horrible problems with aiming and camera control".

References

External links

2006 video games
Army Men
PlayStation 2 games
Team17 games
Third-person shooters
Video games developed in the United Kingdom
Xbox games
Global Star Software games
Single-player video games